Tarzan II (also known as Tarzan 2 and Tarzan 2: The Legend Begins) is a 2005 American direct-to-video musical animated film, and the third and final Disney Tarzan film after Tarzan and Jane, though it chronologically takes place during the events of the original film set during Tarzan's childhood, years before he met Jane. It was produced by Walt Disney Pictures and DisneyToon Studios Australia, with animation outsourced to Toon City Animation. The film tells the story between the young Tarzan is raised by apes and become an adult Tarzan, where he becomes the leader of his gorillas. It follows Tarzan's adventure to discover who he really is. Glenn Close and Lance Henriksen reprise their roles as Kala and Kerchak from the first film while Harrison Chad, Brenda Grate, and Harrison Fahn are the new voices for the younger versions of Tarzan, Terk, and Tantor, replacing Alex D. Linz, Rosie O'Donnell, and Taylor Dempsey. They are joined by new characters voiced by George Carlin, Estelle Harris, Brad Garrett, and Ron Perlman.

Tarzan II was released on VHS and DVD on June 14, 2005.

Plot
As a human orphan being raised by a family of gorillas after his parents were killed in an African jungle, Tarzan is worried that a fabled monster known as the Zugor will someday attempt to capture him. He is disappointed that he can't run as quickly as the other young apes in his family, and his attempts to prove himself keep resulting in chaos, hurting the baby gorillas and disappointing the mother apes and his adoptive father, Kerchak.

The next morning, when an accident leads his ape mother, Kala, to think Tarzan has died after the gorillas have crossed a ravine, the other apes feel that Tarzan has reached a fitting end. Tarzan believes it is best for everyone involved if he runs away.

Alone in the jungle, Tarzan gets chased by Sabor the leopardess to a rocky place known as the Dark Mountain. When the echo of the monster calls, Sabor runs away just as Tarzan is encountered by two hulking, spoiled gorilla brothers, Uto and Kago, and their controlling, over-protective mother Mama Gunda. They fear the Zugor as much as Tarzan does, and when the booming call of the monster again echoes through the valley, the trio flee and Tarzan is able to escape Dark Mountain. He encounters a crotchety old gorilla who at first keeps the boy distant, but Tarzan discovers this gorilla is actually named Zugor and was pretending to be the monster. He uses hollow trees as megaphones to amplify his voice and pretend to be a monster, scaring other jungle creatures away from his territory and food. Tarzan uses this discovery to blackmail Zugor into letting the boy stay with him. Thanks to Tarzan's cheerfulness and helpfulness, Zugor begins to warm up to him. Tarzan continues to try to figure out what he is along with Zugor, but they both promise not to tell anyone.

Meanwhile, Tarzan's two best friends, the young gorilla Terk and the young elephant Tantor, come looking for him, and Kala also finds out that Tarzan is alive, so she goes looking for him as well, but allows the baby gorillas to join her. Terk and Tantor encounter trouble in Dark Mountain in the form of Mama Gunda, Uto, and Kago, but they are able to escape. Terk and Tantor eventually reunite with Tarzan, and the three become best friends once again. They leave Dark Mountain, and Mama Gunda, Uto, and Kago follow them. Tarzan does not want to return home with them but he reveals that there is no monster. Mama Gunda, Uto, and Kago overhear their conversation and learn it was Zugor who was pretending to be the monster; he gets himself into trouble. Uto and Kago wreck Zugor's treehouse in retaliation for scaring them. Zugor accuses Tarzan for breaking his promise and runs away, refusing to help him face the brothers. Terk and Tantor run to go and warn Kerchak. Kala and the baby gorillas arrive near Dark Mountain and also encounter trouble with Mama Gunda, Uto and Kago. Tarzan finally realizes what he is supposed to be: a "Tarzan", with his own special tricks that no one else can do in the jungle, Zugor comes to a similar realization, at which he returns to Tarzan and reconciles with him.

Tarzan is able to use tricks and traps to defeat Uto and Kago as Terk and Tantor try to save Kala and the baby gorillas from falling off a cliff; Tarzan saves Kala just in time. where as Zugor holds Mama Gunda hostage, but due to their connection and Zugor accidentally telling Mama Gunda that she has "beautiful eyes", they both fall in love. Uto and Kago return and are shocked to see them together. Tarzan tells Kala that she was right before and he is a part of her gorilla family.

As the movie ends, Tarzan, Kala, Terk, Tantor and the baby gorillas return to the gorilla troop. Kala gives Tarzan a hug and tells him how proud she is of him for rescuing her from the fall and from Uto and Kago. Mama Gunda punishes her sons for destroying Zugor's treehouse and tells them that there won't be any more fighting or wrecking things. Tarzan, Terk, and Tantor decide to play a monster game; Tarzan is now happy and proud of himself, as he now knows what he is supposed to be. Like the original movie, Tarzan stands on a sequoia tree and closes the movie by letting out the typical Tarzan yell.

Voice cast
 Harrison Chad as Tarzan, a young human orphan raised by gorillas in the jungle. Tarzan was a socially awkward kid struggling to fit in with his ape family. When he was growing up, Tarzan had a childhood fear of the Zugor, a mythical monster said to live on Dark mountain. His second fear was that his mother Kala would get hurt because of him.
 Glenn Close as Kala, Tarzan's adoptive gorilla mother loves her son more than anything. Kala is caring and patient unless provoked, or if her family is in danger.
 Brenda Grate as Terk, Tarzan's mischievous, quick-witted and sardonic "cousin". Her full name is Terkina, but she actually goes by Terk.
 Harrison Fahn as Tantor, a germophobic and neurotic elephant, whose best friends are Terk and Tarzan despite these impediments.
 Lance Henriksen as Kerchak, Kala's mate and the leader of the gorilla family in the jungle who holds a dislike on Tarzan because of his human appearance.
 George Carlin as Zugor, an old hermit gorilla living in a hollow tree on Dark Mountain. He is the "monster" feared by Tarzan and almost all the animals, even Sabor before she was killed by the adult version of Tarzan in the first film.
 Estelle Harris as Mama Gunda, an intimidating, loud, physically short and short-tempered mother of Kago and Uto.
 Brad Garrett as Uto, a cowardly, immature and slow-witted gorilla who likes to throw any creature he finds off a cliff to see if they can fly. He is Kago's younger brother
 Ron Perlman as Kago, an aggressive, hot-headed gorilla, and an all around bully. A running gag is that he always gets the hiccups when he gets poked around. He is Uto's older brother
 Frank Welker as Animals' vocal effects.
 Connor Hutcherson as Tonka

Reception
The movie was nominated at the 33rd Annie Awards for Best Home Entertainment Production. The film received negative reviews from critics, and holds a score of 33% on Rotten Tomatoes based on six reviews.

Music

Mark Mancina, the first movie's composer, returned to compose the score for the film, joined by Dave Metzger. "Leaving Home" later became the song "I Need to Know" for the Broadway musical version of Tarzan. Phil Collins, who performed the songs for the first film, returns to write new songs for the sequel while reusing the ones from the previous film.

Cancelled sequel
In 2004, DisneyToon Studios announced that a second sequel titled Tarzan III, that film focused on Terk and Tantor leading their homes in London with Tarzan and Jane with their son named Paxton. Stan Phillips is attached to direct and write the story to the film. In 2006, it was cancelled by John Lasseter.

References

External links

 
 
 

2005 films
2005 animated films
2005 direct-to-video films
2000s American animated films
2000s adventure comedy films
2005 fantasy films
American adventure comedy films
American children's animated comedy films
Animated adventure films
Animated films about gorillas
Animated films about elephants
Direct-to-video prequel films
Tarzan (franchise)
Disney direct-to-video animated films
DisneyToon Studios animated films
Animated films about orphans
Films set in the 1890s
Films set in Africa
Tarzan films
Films scored by Mark Mancina
Films with screenplays by Jim Kammerud
2005 comedy films
2000s children's animated films
Films with screenplays by Noni White
Films with screenplays by Bob Tzudiker
2000s English-language films
American prequel films